Nuhašše, also Nuhašša, was a region in northwestern Syria that flourished in the 2nd millennium BC. It was a federacy ruled by different kings who collaborated and probably had a high king. Nuhašše changed hands between different powers in the region such as Egypt, Mitanni and the Hittites. It rebelled against the latter which led Šuppiluliuma I to attack and annex the region.

Name, borders and society
The name "Nuhašše" is Semitic meaning rich or prosperous. Nuhašše stretched from the Euphrates valley in the east to the Orontes valley in the west between Hamath in the south and Aleppo in the north; it did not include Ebla and it was separated from the Euphrates river by Emar and Ashtata. In the west, it reached the Orontes river only if it included the region of Niya which is debated. The main city was named Ugulzat (possibly modern Khan Shaykhun). Hittite texts mention the "Kings of Nuhašše", indicating that the region consisted of a number of petty kingdoms that might have formed a confederacy; one of the monarchs took the role of primus inter pares (first among equals), and resided in Ugulzat.

The majority of population in the second half of the second millennium BC was West-Semitic, while the ruling classes were Hurrians. The diplomatic language used in the region was a Hurrianized form of Akkadian as Hurrian traits appear in every Akkadian sentence in tablets written in Nuhašše; the Hurrian elements comprise around fifth of a sentence. The coronation of a king included anointing; a common practice in Bronze Age monarchies of Western Asia.

History

Middle Bronze
The name Nuhašše appears in a bilingual Hittite-Hurrian text (named the Song of Release) which is copied from a Hurrian original dating to 2000 BC. In the Hurrian text, Nuhašše was a close ally of Ebla. The region was mentioned also in the archive of Mari and in the archive of Alalakh but did not designate a politically unified entity; at the times of Mari, the northern regions of Nuhašše were under the supremacy of Yamhad while the southern ones were subordinate to Qatna.

Late Bronze
Thutmose III annexed the region in the fifteenth century BC then Mitanni established its rule over the area. 

A Hittite treaty dating to the reign of Muwatalli II, 13th century BC, mentions earlier border disputes between Nuhašše and Aleppo where the people of Nuhašše asked the Mitannian king to interfere; the king campaigned against Aleppo and gave the disputed lands to Nuhašše. The treaty mentions that the people of Aleppo committed an offence against a Hittite monarch called Hattusili and the Nuhašše petitioned the former for districts belonging to Aleppo; The Hittites granted Nuhašše its request. The date of the border disputes in which the Hittites interfered is related to the date of the monarch named Hattusili but the identity of that king is mysterious but could have reigned as co-king of Arnuwanda I, early 14th century BC.

The Amarna archives reveals that Nuhašše was also engaged in territorial disputes with its neighbour Amurru. In the Iron Age, the region became known as Lu'ash.

References

Citations

Sources

Amarna letters locations
History of Syria